James Mallory may refer to:
James Mallory (jurist) (1916–2003), Canadian jurist and constitutional expert
J. P. Mallory (born 1945), archaeologist and linguistic comparativist
 James Mallory (coach) (1918–2001), American football coach and baseball player
James Mallory (author), co-author, with Mercedes Lackey, of the Obsidian Mountain trilogy